The 2019 Volta a Catalunya was a road cycling stage race, that took place between 25 and 31 March 2019 in Spain. It was the 99th edition of Volta a Catalunya and the ninth race of the 2019 UCI World Tour.

Teams
The 18 UCI WorldTeams were automatically invited to the race. In addition seven second-tier UCI Continental Circuits received a wildcard invitation to participate in the event.

The teams entering the race will be:

UCI WorldTeams

 
 
 
 
 
 
 
 
 
 
 
 
 
 
 
 
 
 

UCI Professional Continental teams

Route

Stages

Stage 1
25 March 2019 — Calella to Calella,

Stage 2
26 March 2019 — Mataró to Sant Feliu de Guíxols,

Stage 3
27 March 2019 — Sant Feliu de Guíxols to Vallter 2000,

Stage 4
28 March 2019 — Llanars to La Molina,

Stage 5
29 March 2019 — Puigcerdà to Sant Cugat del Vallès,

Stage 6
30 March 2019 — Valls to Vila-Seca,

Stage 7
31 March 2019 — Barcelona to Barcelona,

Classification leadership table

Final classification standings

General classification

Points classification

Mountains classification

Young rider classification

Teams classification

References

Sources
 

2019
2019 UCI World Tour
2019 in Spanish sport
March 2019 sports events in Spain